Unpretty Rapstar (Korean: 언프리티 랩스타) is a South Korean rap competition TV show that airs on Mnet. The show has thus far released three compilation albums.

Compilation albums

Unpretty Rapstar

Unpretty Rapstar 2

Unpretty Rapstar 3

See also
 Show Me the Money discography

References

Discographies of South Korean artists
Hip hop discographies